The Battle of Dilman (April 15, 1915) was a battle during World War I fought at Dilman between the Russian Empire and the Ottoman Empire.

Despite having the larger forces, the Ottomans suffered 468 dead, 1,228 wounded, and 370 missing in the first day. Many injured Ottoman soldiers were abandoned on the field of battle. More than half of the Ottoman troops were Kurdish, almost all of whom deserted. By the end of the battle, the Ottomans had 3,500 of its soldiers killed.

The result was a Russian-Armenian victory under Tovmas Nazarbekian and Andranik Ozanian. Armenian and Assyrian volunteers had an important role in the victory. Apart from the Armenian officers who served under Tovmas Nazarbekian's Russian Caucasus Army, the Armenians also deployed a volunteer battalion under the leadership of their commander Andranik and with the participation of Smbat Baroyan.

One month later, Halil Kut abandoned Persia with his army reduced to half of its original size. Halil blamed his defeat on the Christians and ordered the execution of all Armenians and Assyrians among his own soldiers. German military advisors reported the murder of several hundred unarmed Armenian and Assyrian soldiers and officers. The Armenian, Assyrian, and Persian civilians of northwestern Persia were also massacred by Ottoman troops.

See also 
 Sarkis Jebejian

References 

Dilman
1915 in Iran
1915 in the Russian Empire
1915 in the Ottoman Empire
20th century in Armenia
Dilman
Dilman
Dilman
History of Van Province
History of West Azerbaijan Province
April 1915 events
Middle Eastern theatre of World War I